Martín Vasquez de Arce, O.P. (died January 13, 1609) was a Roman Catholic prelate who served as the Bishop of Puerto Rico (1599–1609).

Biography
Martín Vasquez de Arce was born in Cuzco, Spain and ordained a priest in the Order of Preachers. On August 18, 1599, he was appointed by the King of Spain and confirmed by Pope Clement VIII as Bishop of Puerto Rico. While bishop, he was the Co-Consecrator of Juan Ramírez de Arellano, Bishop of Santiago de Guatemala, Juan Pérez de Espinosa, Bishop of Santiago de Chile, and Mateo Burgos Moraleja, Bishop of Pamplona. He served as Bishop of Puerto Rico until his death on January 13, 1609.

References

External links and additional sources
 (for Chronology of Bishops) 
 (for Chronology of Bishops) 

1609 deaths
Bishops appointed by Pope Clement VIII
Dominican bishops
16th-century Roman Catholic bishops in Puerto Rico
17th-century Roman Catholic bishops in Puerto Rico